Montgomery County is a county in the east central part of the U.S. state of Missouri. As of the 2020 census, the population was 11,322. Its county seat is Montgomery City. The county was named in honor of Richard Montgomery, an American Revolutionary War general killed in 1775 while attempting to capture Quebec City, Canada.

The county comprises a portion of the Missouri Rhineland. It is approximately halfway between Columbia and St. Louis.

History
The county has evidence of human habitation from 10,000 years ago, the Archaic period of indigenous Americans. An ancient site was found during archaeological excavations at Graham Cave on the Loutre River.

In the early 19th century, European settlement started at a greater pace, after exploration during previous decades by French trappers and British and American fur traders.

Although the Loutre Island area is commonly associated with the German-founded towns of Rhineland and Starkenburg, established by immigrants of the mid-19th century and later, it was originally settled by Missouri's Anglo-southern settlers from places such as Kentucky or Virginia. Although the southern part of the county is more closely associated with Missouri's Rhineland, its northern part is more associated with Missouri's "Little Dixie" region, earning Montgomery county the nickname "Gateway to Little Dixie".

An early house of worship was a log church, which is still maintained as a chapel. St. Martin's Church is also located in Starkenburg, built in 1873 and listed on the National Register of Historic Places. Above its entrance is the text: "This is the House Of God and the Gate Of Heaven."

Starkenburg is also the site of the Shrine of Our Lady of Sorrows Catholic Church, built in the early 20th century and listed on the NRHP. For further devotions and pilgrimage, the community created an outdoor area for representations of the Stations of the Cross, Mount Calvary and Holy Sepulchre. Starkenburg is located inland from the Missouri River.

Geography

Adjacent counties
 Audrain County (northwest)
 Pike County (northeast)
 Lincoln County (east)
 Warren County (southeast)
 Gasconade County (south)
 Callaway County (west)
 Osage County (southwest)

Major highways
  Interstate 70
  U.S. Route 40
  Route 19
  Route 94
  Route 161

Climate

Demographics

As of the census of 2000, there were 12,136 people, 4,775 households, and 3,337 families residing in the county. The population density was 23 people per square mile (9/km2). There were 5,726 housing units at an average density of 11 per square mile (4/km2). The racial makeup of the county was 95.97% White, 2.04% Black or African American, 0.24% Native American, 0.26% Asian, 0.01% Pacific Islander, 0.21% from other races, and 1.28% from two or more races. Approximately 0.77% of the population were Hispanic or Latino of any race. 39.1% were of German, 18.4% American, 10.2% English and 9.2% Irish ancestry.

There were 4,775 households, out of which 31.30% had children under the age of 18 living with them, 56.90% were married couples living together, 8.60% had a female householder with no husband present, and 30.10% were non-families. 26.30% of all households were made up of individuals, and 13.20% had someone living alone who was 65 years of age or older. The average household size was 2.47 and the average family size was 2.97.

In the county, the population was spread out, with 25.40% under the age of 18, 7.40% from 18 to 24, 26.10% from 25 to 44, 23.90% from 45 to 64, and 17.20% who were 65 years of age or older. The median age was 39 years. For every 100 females there were 98.10 males. For every 100 females age 18 and over, there were 93.70 males.

The median income for a household in the county was $32,772, and the median income for a family was $38,632. Males had a median income of $27,933 versus $19,809 for females. The per capita income for the county was $15,092. About 8.40% of families and 11.80% of the population were below the poverty line, including 15.60% of those under age 18 and 10.60% of those age 65 or over.

2020 Census

Community groups
 Montgomery County Human Resource Board
 Montgomery County Citizens for Health Improvement Project
 Montgomery County Women in Agriculture
 Wellsville-Middletown Young Farmers/Young Farm Wives
 Montgomery City Lions Club
 Montgomery County Knights of Columbus
 Montgomery County Literacy Council
 Montgomery County Extension Council
 Montgomery County 4-H Council
 Customs and Classics Car Club
 Montgomery County Old Threshers Association
 Montgomery County Fair Association

Education

Public schools
 Montgomery County R-II School District – Montgomery City
 Montgomery County Elementary School (PK–5)
 Jonesburg Elementary School (PK–5) – Jonesburg
 Montgomery County Middle School (grades 6–8)
 Montgomery County High School (9–12)
 Wellsville-Middletown R-I School District – Wellsville
 Wellsville Elementary School (PK–6)
 Wellsville High School (7–12)

Private schools
 Immaculate Conception School – Montgomery City (PK-06) – Roman Catholic

Public libraries
Montgomery City Public Library  
Wellsville Public Library

Politics

Local
The Republican Party predominantly controls politics at the local level in Montgomery County. Republicans hold all but one of the elected positions in the county.

State

Montgomery County is part of Missouri's 42nd district in the Missouri House of Representatives and is represented by  Bart Korman (R-High Hill).

Montgomery County is a part of Missouri's 10th District in the Missouri Senate and is currently represented by Jeanie Riddle (R-Fulton).

Federal

Montgomery County is included in Missouri's 3rd congressional district and is represented by Blaine Luetkemeyer (R-St. Elizabeth) in the U.S. House of Representatives.

Communities

Cities

 Bellflower
 High Hill
 Jonesburg
 McKittrick
 Middletown
 Montgomery City (county seat)
 New Florence
 Wellsville

Village
 Rhineland

Census-designated places
Big Spring
Danville

Other unincorporated places

 Americus
 Bluffton
 Buell
 Egbert
 Gamma
 Marling
 Mineola
 Prices Branch
 Starkenburg

See also
 National Register of Historic Places listings in Montgomery County, Missouri

References

External links
 St. Martin's Church
 Digitized 1930 Plat Book of Montgomery County  from University of Missouri Division of Special Collections, Archives, and Rare Books

 
Missouri Rhineland
1818 establishments in Missouri Territory
Populated places established in 1818
Missouri counties on the Missouri River